Oruma is one of three small Inland Ijaw languages of Nigeria. According to Ethnologue, it is not fully intelligible with other varieties of Inland Ijaw.

References

Languages of Nigeria
Ijoid languages
Indigenous languages of Rivers State